In geometry, the tetrahemihexahedron or hemicuboctahedron is a uniform star polyhedron, indexed as U4. It has 7 faces (4 triangles and 3 squares), 12 edges, and 6 vertices. Its vertex figure is a crossed quadrilateral.

It is the only non-prismatic uniform polyhedron with an odd number of faces. Its Wythoff symbol is 3/2 3 | 2, but that represents a double covering of the tetrahemihexahedron with eight triangles and six squares, paired and coinciding in space. (It can more intuitively be seen as two coinciding tetrahemihexahedra.)

It is a hemipolyhedron. The "hemi" part of the name means some of the faces form a group with half as many members as some regular polyhedron—here, three square faces form a group with half as many faces as the regular hexahedron, better known as the cube—hence hemihexahedron. Hemi faces are also oriented in the same direction as the regular polyhedron's faces. The three square faces of the tetrahemihexahedron are, like the three facial orientations of the cube, mutually perpendicular.

The "half-as-many" characteristic also means that hemi faces must pass through the center of the polyhedron, where they all intersect each other. Visually, each square is divided into four right triangles, with two visible from each side.

Related surfaces
It is a non-orientable surface. It is unique as the only uniform polyhedron with an Euler characteristic of 1 and is hence a projective polyhedron, yielding a representation of the real projective plane very similar to the Roman surface.

Related polyhedra
It has the same vertices and edges as the regular octahedron. It also shares 4 of the 8 triangular faces of the octahedron, but has three additional square faces passing through the centre of the polyhedron.

The dual figure is the tetrahemihexacron.

It is 2-covered by the cuboctahedron, which accordingly has the same abstract vertex figure (2 triangles and two squares: 3.4.3.4) and twice the vertices, edges, and faces. It has the same topology as the abstract polyhedron hemi-cuboctahedron.

It may also be constructed as a crossed triangular cuploid. All cuploids and their duals are topologically projective planes.

Tetrahemihexacron

The tetrahemihexacron is the dual of the tetrahemihexahedron, and is one of nine dual hemipolyhedra.

Since the hemipolyhedra have faces passing through the center, the dual figures  have corresponding vertices at infinity; properly, on the real projective plane at infinity. In Magnus Wenninger's Dual Models, they are represented with intersecting prisms, each extending in both directions to the same vertex at infinity, in order to maintain symmetry. In practice the model prisms are cut off at a certain point that is convenient for the maker. Wenninger suggested these figures are members of a new class of stellation figures, called stellation to infinity. However, he also suggested that strictly speaking they are not polyhedra because their construction does not conform to the usual definitions.

Topologically it is considered to contain seven vertices. The three vertices considered at infinity (the real projective plane at infinity) correspond directionally to the three vertices of the hemi-octahedron, an abstract polyhedron. The other four vertices exist at alternate corners of a central cube (a demicube, in this case a tetrahedron).

References

 
 (Page 101, Duals of the (nine) hemipolyhedra)

External links

Uniform polyhedra and duals
Paper model
Great Stella: software used to create main image on this page

Uniform polyhedra
Projective polyhedra